The American Athletic Conference softball tournament is the conference championship tournament in college softball for the American Athletic Conference.  It is a single-elimination tournament, with seeding based on regular season records.  The winner receives the conference's automatic bid to the NCAA Division I Softball Championship each season.  The Tournament champion is separate from the conference champion.  The conference championship is determined solely by regular season record.

The American is one of two successors to the original Big East Conference, which split after the 2013 season.  The first year of the tournament was held at Cougar Softball Stadium in Houston, Texas.

Tournament
The American softball tournament is a single-elimination tournament held each year at various American-conference campus stadiums. Eight of the twelve current all-sport members of the conference sponsor softball. Cincinnati, SMU, Temple, and Tulane do not sponsor softball teams.

Champions

Year-by-year

By school

Italics indicate school no longer sponsors softball in The American.

References

 
2014 establishments in Texas
Recurring sporting events established in 2014